Edmund Heller (May 21, 1875 – July 18, 1939) was an American zoologist. He was President of the Association of Zoos & Aquariums for two terms, from 1935-1936 and 1937-1938.

Early life
While at Stanford University, he collected specimens in the Colorado and Mojave Deserts in 1896-7 before graduating with a degree in zoology in 1901.

Contributions
In 1907, Heller was with Carl Ethan Akeley on the Field Columbian Museum's African expedition. On his return, he was appointed Curator of Mammals at the Museum of Vertebrate Zoology of the University of California and participated in the 1908 Alexander Alaska Expedition.

In 1909, Heller began working with the Smithsonian Institution when he was chosen as naturalist for large mammals on the Smithsonian-Roosevelt African Expedition under the command of Colonel Theodore Roosevelt. He worked closely with John Alden Loring who worked as naturalist for the small mammals on the Expedition and they collaborated on their field notes. On his return from the expedition, he co-authored Life Histories of African Game Animals with Roosevelt. Heller also accompanied the Rainey African Expedition of 1911-1912 for the Smithsonian and led the Smithsonian Cape-to-Cairo Expedition of 1919-1920.

Heller also participated in explorations in Alaska with the Biological Survey, in Peru with Yale University and the National Geographic Society, in China with the American Museum of Natural History, and in Russia with Paul J. Rainey, official photographer to the Czech army in Siberia.

From 1926 to 1928, he was curator of mammals at the Field Museum of Natural History in Chicago. Edmund Heller was the director of the Washington Park Zoo in Milwaukee (from 1928 to 1935) and the Fleishhacker Zoo in San Francisco (from 1935 to 1939).

He was also the president of the AZA from 1935 to 1939. At the beginning of the 20th century he led many expeditions to Africa and in 1914 he wrote the book Life-histories of African Game Animals in collaboration with Theodore Roosevelt.

Species and subspecies which were named in honor of Heller include the Southern Pacific rattlesnake (Crotalus helleri), Heller's coral snake (Micrurus lemniscatus helleri), a skink (Panaspis helleri), the red-necked keelback (Rhabdophis subminiatus helleri), the Taita thrush (Turdus helleri), and the puna thistletail (Schizoeaca helleri).

Popular culture
 Heller, played by Paul Birchard, appears in the TV series The Young Indiana Jones in an episode featuring the Smithsonian-African Expedition (1909-1910).

Literature

See also
:Category:Taxa named by Edmund Heller

References

External links
Edmund Heller biography by the AZA

American mammalogists
1875 births
1939 deaths
Stanford University alumni
Scientists from California
19th-century American zoologists
20th-century American zoologists